"Would I" is a song written by Mark Winchester and recorded by American country music artist Randy Travis. It was released in September 1996 as the second single from the album Full Circle.  The song reached number 25 on the Billboard Hot Country Singles & Tracks chart.

Music video
The music video was directed by Marc Kalbfeld and premiered in 1996.

Chart performance
"Would I" debuted at number 67 on the U.S. Billboard Hot Country Singles & Tracks chart for the week of October 5, 1996.

References

1997 singles
Randy Travis songs
Song recordings produced by Kyle Lehning
Warner Records Nashville singles
1996 songs